In mathematics, a Riemann sum is a certain kind of approximation of an integral by a finite sum. It is named after nineteenth century German mathematician Bernhard Riemann. One very common application is approximating the area of functions or lines on a graph, but also the length of curves and other approximations. 

The sum is calculated by partitioning the region into shapes (rectangles, trapezoids, parabolas, or cubics) that together form a region that is similar to the region being measured, then calculating the area for each of these shapes, and finally adding all of these small areas together. This approach can be used to find a numerical approximation for a definite integral even if the fundamental theorem of calculus does not make it easy to find a closed-form solution.

Because the region by the small shapes is usually not exactly the same shape as the region being measured, the Riemann sum will differ from the area being measured. This error can be reduced by dividing up the region more finely, using smaller and smaller shapes. As the shapes get smaller and smaller, the sum approaches the Riemann integral.

Definition 

One might produce different Riemann sums depending on which 's are chosen. In the end this will not matter, if the function is Riemann integrable, when the difference or width of the summands  approaches zero.

Types of Riemann sums 
Specific choices of  give different types of Riemann sums:
 If  for all i, the method is the left rule and gives a left Riemann sum.
 If  for all i, the method is the right rule and gives a right Riemann sum.
 If  for all i, the method is the midpoint rule and gives a middle Riemann sum.
 If  (that is, the supremum of f over ), the method is the upper rule and gives an upper Riemann sum or upper Darboux sum.
 If  (that is, the infimum of f over ), the method is the lower rule and gives a lower Riemann sum or lower Darboux sum.

All these Riemann summation methods are among the most basic ways to accomplish numerical integration. Loosely speaking, a function is Riemann integrable if all Riemann sums converge as the partition "gets finer and finer".

While not derived as a Riemann sum, taking the average of the left and right Riemann sums is the trapezoidal rule and gives a trapezoidal sum. It is one of the simplest of a very general way of approximating integrals using weighted averages. This is followed in complexity by Simpson's rule and Newton–Cotes formulas.

This forms the basis of the Darboux integral, which is ultimately equivalent to the Riemann integral.

Riemann summation methods 
The four Riemann summation methods are usually best approached with subintervals of equal size. The interval  is therefore divided into  subintervals, each of length

The points in the partition will then be

Left rule 

For the left rule, the function is approximated by its values at the left endpoints of the subintervals. This gives multiple rectangles with base  and height .

The left Riemann sum amounts to an overestimation if f is monotonically decreasing on this interval, and an underestimation if it is monotonically increasing.
The error of this formula will be 

Right rule 

For the right rule, the function is approximated by its values at the right endpoints of the subintervals. This gives multiple rectangles with base  and height .

The right Riemann sum amounts to an underestimation if f is monotonically decreasing, and an overestimation if it is monotonically increasing.
The error of this formula will be 

Midpoint rule 

For the midpoint rule, the function is approximated by its values at the midpoints of the subintervals. This gives  for the first subinterval,  for the next one, and so on until . Summing the resulting areas gives

The error of this formula will be

This error is half of that of the trapezoidal sum; as such the middle Riemann sum is the most accurate approach to the Riemann sum.

Trapezoidal rule 

For the trapezoidal rule, the function is approximated by the average of its values at the left and right endpoints of the subintervals.

The error of this formula will be

The approximation obtained with the trapezoidal sum for a function is the same as the average of the left hand and right hand sums of that function.

Connection with integration 
For a one-dimensional Riemann sum over domain , as the maximum size of a subinterval shrinks to zero (that is the limit of the norm of the subintervals goes to zero), some functions will have all Riemann sums converge to the same value. This limiting value, if it exists, is defined as the definite Riemann integral of the function over the domain,

For a finite-sized domain, if the maximum size of a subinterval shrinks to zero, this implies the number of subinterval goes to infinity. For finite partitions, Riemann sums are always approximations to the limiting value and this approximation gets better as the partition gets finer. The following animations help demonstrate how increasing the number of subintervals (while lowering the maximum subinterval size) better approximates the "area" under the curve:

Since the red function here is assumed to be a smooth function, all three Riemann sums will converge to the same value as the number of subintervals goes to infinity.

Example 

Taking an example, the area under the curve  over [0, 2] can be procedurally computed using Riemann's method. 

Because the right Riemann sum is to be used, the sequence of  coordinates for the boxes will be . Therefore, the sequence of the heights of the boxes will be .

The area of each box will be  and therefore the nth right Riemann sum will be: 

If the limit is viewed as n → ∞, it can be concluded that the approximation approaches the actual value of the area under the curve as the number of boxes increases. Hence:

This method agrees with the definite integral as calculated in more mechanical ways:

Because the function is continuous and monotonically increasing over the interval, a right Riemann sum overestimates the integral by the largest amount (while a left Riemann sum would underestimate the integral by the largest amount). This fact, which is intuitively clear from the diagrams, shows how the nature of the function determines how accurate the integral is estimated. While simple, right and left Riemann sums are often less accurate than more advanced techniques of estimating an integral such as the Trapezoidal rule or Simpson's rule.

The example function has an easy-to-find anti-derivative so estimating the integral by Riemann sums is mostly an academic exercise; however it must be remembered that not all functions have anti-derivatives so estimating their integrals by summation is practically important.

Higher dimensions 
The basic idea behind a Riemann sum is to "break-up" the domain via a partition into pieces, multiply the "size" of each piece by some value the function takes on that piece, and sum all these products. This can be generalized to allow Riemann sums for functions over domains of more than one dimension.

While intuitively, the process of partitioning the domain is easy to grasp, the technical details of how the domain may be partitioned get much more complicated than the one dimensional case and involves aspects of the geometrical shape of the domain.

Two dimensions 
In two dimensions, the domain  may be divided into a number of two-dimensional cells  such that . The two-dimensional Riemann sum is

where .

Three dimensions 
In three dimensions, the domain  is partitioned into a number of three-dimensional cells  such that . The three-dimensional Riemann sum is

where .

Arbitrary number of dimensions 
Higher dimensional Riemann sums follow a similar pattern. An n-dimensional Riemann sum is

where , that is, it is a point in the n-dimensional cell  with n-dimensional volume .

Generalization 
In high generality, Riemann sums can be written

Roughly speaking, a measure is a function that gives a "size" of a set, in this case the size of the set ; in one dimension this can often be interpreted as a length, in two dimensions as an area, in three dimensions as a volume, and so on.

See also 
 Antiderivative
 Euler method and midpoint method, related methods for solving differential equations
 Lebesgue integral
 Riemann integral, limit of Riemann sums as the partition becomes infinitely fine
 Simpson's rule, a powerful numerical method more powerful than basic Riemann sums or even the Trapezoidal rule
 Trapezoidal rule, numerical method based on the average of the left and right Riemann sum

References

External links 
 
 A simulation showing the convergence of Riemann sums

Integral calculus
Bernhard Riemann